Tarzan's Greatest Adventure is a 1959 Eastmancolor adventure film directed by John Guillermin, produced by Sy Weintraub and Harvey Hayutin, and written by Les Crutchfield, based on the character created by Edgar Rice Burroughs. With a strong supporting cast that included Anthony Quayle and Sean Connery, and a focus on action and suspense, the film won critical praise as a Tarzan film that appealed to adults as well as children.

The film features a literate Tarzan portrayed by Gordon Scott. The character of Jane, Tarzan's wife, does not appear and is not mentioned. At one point, Tarzan briefly romances a female character, suggesting that he is a loner, not a family man. Cheeta, Tarzan's chimp companion in many films, appears only a few times near the start of the film, and the kind of comic relief that Cheeta represents is generally absent from the film.

Plot
At night, the village of Mantu is raided for its supply of dynamite. The village doctor and radio operator interrupt the robbery and are fatally shot. Before dying, the operator gasps, "Slade" over the shortwave radio.

The next morning, Tarzan is awakened by African drums that alert him to something wrong. He arrives at Mantu, where a funeral is held for the fallen villagers. British police inspector Colonel Sundley informs Tarzan of what happened and that root dye was found. This leads Tarzan to believe that the robbers were "white men painted black". Tarzan meets Angie, an American model and pilot. Angie tells him that she overheard the name "Slade" on her airplane radio. Tarzan remembers a Slade, a ruthless criminal who once sacrificed three men rather than lose the hunt for a prized rogue elephant.

After dropping off his pet chimpanzee Cheeta at his treehouse, Tarzan travels by canoe to catch Slade and his gang. Along the way he sees Angie's plane. She taunts him with low flyovers. However, her engine stalls, and she crashes into the river. Tarzan saves her from a crocodile. Being unable to leave her stranded, he brings Angie to the hunt.

Meanwhile, Slade and his quartet of thieves (consisting of the sullen ex-con Dino, the drunkard O'Bannion, the German Kreiger, and Slade's girlfriend, Toni) continue by riverboat towards what is revealed to be a secret diamond mine. The dynamite was stolen for excavating the gems. When their riverboat malfunctions, the thieves begin to quarrel among themselves, allowing Tarzan and Angie to catch up. O'Bannion's teases Dino, who tries to kill him. In the ensuing chase, Dino stumbles into quicksand and drowns. The criminals find their boat riddled with arrows, a signal that Tarzan has tracked them down. Slade and O'Bannion disembark, while Kreiger hurls dynamite at Tarzan, wounding him. Tarzan manages to kill O'Bannion, but Slade closes in. With Slade gone, Kreiger believes he can coerce Toni into telling him where the diamond mine is. Slade comes back, pummels Kreiger into submission, and continues the journey towards the mine.

Tarzan's injuries require Angie to tend to him, she comforts him and risks her life to steal medical supplies from Slade's boat. She is captured by Slade, who uses her to lure Tarzan into a trap. With Slade absent, Kreiger sees another chance, he frees Angie and tells her to inform Tarzan where they are. Toni overhears Kreiger and flees to warn Slade, but accidentally falls to her death through a trap door pit meant for Tarzan.  Kreiger convinces Slade that Toni was frightened by a passing lion, and the men continue toward the mine. Once inside, Kreiger confirms that it is a mother lode of diamonds. However, Slade is more interested in killing Tarzan than in the gems. Kreiger tries to kill Slade, but fails. Slade confronts Kreiger, who offers him all the diamonds he has collected if he lets him go. Unmoved, Slade kills Kreiger.

Tarzan is nursed back to health by Angie. He continues to be obsessed with capturing Slade, much to her displeasure. Tarzan thanks Angie for her help, and swings away for a final confrontation with Slade.

From high atop a river bluff, Slade fires rifle shots at Tarzan, who reaches him despite this. At first Slade gets the upper hand by lassoing Tarzan with his wire noose. However, Tarzan's superior strength and endurance wins out, and he pushes Slade over the edge of the cliff onto the rocks below.

Tarzan bellows his famous yell, runs to a pool, and gazes upon his reflection triumphantly. He sees Angie below, steering the boat back to Mantu. Tarzan hesitates, considering joining her. But he looks back at the jungle, realizes that is where he belongs, and returns instead to his treehouse and Cheeta.

Cast
 Gordon Scott as Tarzan
 Anthony Quayle as Slade
 Sara Shane as Angie Loring
 Sean Connery as O'Bannion
 Niall MacGinnis as Kreiger
 Al Mulock as Dino
 Scilla Gabel as Toni

Production notes
The Tarzan films had been produced by Sol Lesser since Tarzan Triumphs (1943). In April 1958 Lesser sold his company, including the rights to the Tarzan films, to Sy Weintraub for a reported $3.5 million.

Gordon Scott had played Tarzan for the four previous films in the series under Lesser: Tarzan's Hidden Jungle (1955), Tarzan and the Lost Safari (1957), Tarzan and the Trappers (1958), and Tarzan's Fight for Life (1958). In July 1958 he announced he would not return as Tarzan, refusing to sign an exclusive contract. Weintraub said he would find a new Tarzan.

In September 1958 Weintraub announced he had signed a two picture deal with Paramount Pictures to make two Tarzan films. The films would be shot on location and the first one would be called Tarzan's World Adventure. They were still looking for an actor to replace Scott. In October the producers announced Theodore B. Sillis had signed to direct. In November Hedda Hopper reported that Weintraub, unable to find a new Tarzan, has signed a seven year deal with Scott to play the role.

The producer decided to make a different style of film. Tarzan's Greatest Adventure would present a grittier, more realistic Tarzan. A loner who could be as savage as his opponents, but could also speak eloquently and politely to allies. Tarzan would also be made vulnerable and not as invincible as previous incarnations.

"Tarzan has grown up," said Scott in 1959. "I speak clearly understandable, everyday English." He also said "Lesser saw Tarzan as part of a family unit, but if you read Burroughs' books, the bastard [Greystoke] really knew what to do. I always wanted to play it with some scars on me; he used to battle the bull apes, you know, and get a couple of  lumps. I wanted to pursue that, but they  wouldn't buy it. It may seem like a minor thing, but those minor things really add up."

This vision of Tarzan heralded a new direction for the character and the series. He became more like the original Edgar Rice Burroughs creation (that is, articulate and intuitive) and even occasionally traveled abroad to make other wilderness regions safe—as in Tarzan Goes to India (1962) and Tarzan and the Valley of Gold (1966).

Filming started 9 February 1959. The film was shot on location in Kenya and at Shepperton Studios in London. Stock safari footage was used to portray wildlife, especially animal attacks. Paramount did a deal with Sol Lesser Productions with a guarantee of $600,000  in turn for the releasing rights; the deal also gave Paramount 50% of the ownership of the negative. The film cost $750,000. Paramount agreed to pay for prints and advertising.

John Guillermin later said "For a short schedule, fairly  low-budget picture, the whole affair really  got me quite excited."

Scott said "Connery was marvelous... He and I had some good giggles, when we got back to Shepperton. They wanted to use him in the next Tarzan, even though he gets killed in this one because he was very good. He said OK. but he had to do this thing for [producers Albert] Broccoli and [Harry] Saltzman — and that was Dr. No. We couldn't touch him after that."

While the film was being made, Metro-Goldwyn-Mayer made their own Tarzan film, Tarzan, the Ape Man (1959). They were able to do this because they retained remake rights for the 1932 film of the same name.

Reception
According to Kinematograph Weekly the film performed "better than average" at the British box office in 1959.

FilmInk called it "a masterpiece in the series, the best Tarzan film since Tarzan and His Mate (1934), and perhaps the most remarkable “turnaround of a franchise” in Hollywood history... the leap in quality after what had been over a decade of steady decline is remarkable."

Gordon Scott stayed for one more Tarzan film, Tarzan the Magnificent (1960), before being replaced by Jock Mahoney in Tarzan Goes to India (1962) which was also directed by Guillermin.

References

Notes
 Essoe, Gabe, Tarzan of the Movies, 1968, The Citadel Press
 Fury, David, Kings of the jungle : an illustrated reference to "Tarzan" on screen and television, 1994, McFarland & Co.

External links
 
 
 
Tazan's Greatest Adventure at Letterbox DVD
Tarzan's Greatest Adventure at BFI
 
 
 Al Mulock(Aveleyman)
 ERBzine Silver Screen: Tarzan's Greatest Adventure

1959 films
American fantasy adventure films
1950s fantasy adventure films
American sequel films
British fantasy adventure films
British sequel films
Films directed by John Guillermin
Films scored by Douglas Gamley
Paramount Pictures films
Tarzan films
Films shot in Kenya
Films shot at Shepperton Studios
Films produced by Sy Weintraub
1950s English-language films
1950s American films
1950s British films